Luciano Spalletti (born 7 March 1959) is an Italian football manager and a former player. He is currently the manager of Italian Serie A club Napoli.

Playing career
Born in Certaldo, Metropolitan City of Florence, Spalletti started his career as a semi-professional footballer in his mid-20s. Despite relatively old age for a professional debut, he managed to have played for several Serie C teams such as Entella, Spezia, Viareggio and Empoli. After nearly a decade of lower-tier football in Italy, he retired in 1993 and remained at Empoli as a coach.

Coaching career

Early career
Spalletti's early career in management led him to struggling Empoli, where he was head coach between July 1993 and June 1998. He led the Tuscan side to consecutive promotions from Serie C1 to the top-flight Serie A. Spalletti then coached Sampdoria from July 1998 to June 1999, and Venezia from July to October 1999.

Spalletti had two spells as head coach at Udinese. The first was between March 2001 and June 2001, the second between July 2002 and June 2005. There was a period at Ancona in between spells.

It was at Udinese where he really began to make an impact as a manager. During the 2004–05 season, Spalletti guided Udinese to a sensational fourth-placed finish in Serie A, exceeding expectations and securing a spot in the UEFA Champions League. Spalletti became coach of Roma in June 2005.

Roma
Such success for a traditionally unexceptional side with limited resources attracted the attention of Roma. The capital side had come off a disappointing season, in which four different coaches had spells in charge of the club. Spalletti was offered the task of attempting to bring order to this chaotic side. After an uninspiring first half of the 2005–06 season, he changed the team's tactics to suit a more offensive playing style, rather than a defensive-minded system. Spalletti's favoured formation was the 4–2–3–1 system, which used four defenders, two defensive midfielders, two wingers (both sides of the 3), one attacking midfielder, and one striker Francesco Totti, who typically functioned also as an attacking midfielder in previous seasons. As such, the team played without any real striker, as Totti occupied what later came to be described as a false-9 role. This system proved effective for Roma upon its introduction during the 2005–06 season, as on 26 February 2006, Roma broke the Serie A record for most consecutive wins with a 2–0 victory over Lazio, following an 11-match winning streak. As a result, Roma climbed from 15th place to 5th place in the table. However, by the end of the season, Roma failed to reach fourth place, therefore failing to qualify for the Champions League. Spalletti did manage to help Roma reach the 2006 Coppa Italia Final, but ultimately lost out on the title to Inter Milan. Nonetheless, as a result of the 2006 Serie A match-fixing scandal, Roma qualified for the 2006–07 UEFA Champions League, as league champions Juventus were relegated, while Fiorentina and Milan both received point deductions for their involvement.

At the end of 2006, Spalletti was elected Serie A Coach of the Year and, in the following months, led Roma until the Champions League quarter-final after a 2–0 victory over Lyon at the Stade Gerland in the first knockout round. The team, however, succeeded in becoming the first team to defeat Roberto Mancini's Inter Milan in all competitions that year, emerging with a 1–3 result at the San Siro, a match that the Nerazzurri had to win to mathematically claim the 2007 Scudetto against the only credible rival they had in the championship. Roma would also win the 2007 Coppa Italia Final against Inter, with an aggregate result of 7–4; a resounding 6–2 in the first leg in Rome and followed by a narrow 2–1 defeat in Milan. It was the first important trophy in Spalletti's career, who only had won a Coppa Italia di Serie C with Empoli. But he was yet to add another piece of silverware to his cabinet, as Roma would again defeat Inter 0–1 in Milan in the opening fixture of the 2007–08 season to steal their Supercoppa Italiana crown.

In the 2007–08 Champions League first knockout round, Spalletti's Roma team became the first Italian team to defeat Real Madrid over two legs (2–1 in both ties in Rome and Madrid) and consequently also became the first European side to record two victories over Real Madrid in their Santiago Bernabéu home ground. In a repeat of the previous season's quarter-final, Roma were again eliminated from the Champions League by eventual winners Manchester United. However, they did succeed in their defence of the Coppa Italia, once again defeating Scudetto winners Inter in the 2008 Coppa Italia Final — a single match which Roma won 2–1.

Spalletti faced a difficult 2008–09 season with Roma, only managing to qualify for the UEFA Europa League with a sixth-place position in the league, after a struggling initial period that left the giallorossi in the bottom half of the league for the first part of the Serie A season.

The new season saw Spalletti struggling with a limited squad, that was weakened further by the sale of Alberto Aquilani to Liverpool, and compounded by serious financial problems for the club. Roma started the season by taking part in two 2009–10 UEFA Europa League qualifying rounds, both easily won against Gent (10–2 on aggregate) and Košice (10–4 on aggregate). However, another poor start in the 2009–10 Serie A season, with two consecutive defeats (2–3 to Genoa and 1–3, at home, to Juventus) prompted Spalletti to resign on 1 September 2009.

Zenit

In December 2009, it was confirmed Spalletti would join Russian Premier League club Zenit Saint Petersburg on a three-year deal, replacing interim coach Anatoli Davydov, with Italian coaches Daniele Baldini, Marco Domenichini and Alberto Bartali also joining the Russian club. For his first year, Zenit's board of directors expected Spalletti to return the Premier League title, win the Russian Cup and progress past the group stage of the Champions League.

Zenit won the Russian Cup on 16 May 2010, defeating Sibir Novosibirsk in the final (having beaten Volga Tver in the quarter-final and Amkar Perm in the semi-final). After 16 matches in the 2010 Premier League, with 12 wins and 4 draws under Spalletti, Zenit reached 40 points, a new Russian Premier League record for most points won at that stage of the campaign. In the summer transfer window of 2010, Spalletti made his first signings: forward Aleksandr Bukharov and midfielder Sergei Semak both came from Rubin Kazan, while defenders Aleksandar Luković and Bruno Alves joined from Udinese and Porto respectively. On 25 August 2010, Zenit lost its first match under Spalletti to French side Auxerre and failed to advance to the 2010–11 UEFA Champions League group stage, though Zenit moved on to play in the group stage of the 2010–11 UEFA Europa League.

On 3 October 2010, Zenit beat Spartak Nalchik to set another Russian Premier League record for most consecutive undefeated matches with 21 since the start of the league season. On 27 October 2010, Zenit suffered its first defeat of the season at the hands of rival club Spartak Moscow, seven matches short of finishing the championship undefeated. On 14 November, Zenit defeated Rostov and, two matches prior to the end of the season, claimed the championship title, the first of Spalletti's coaching career.

Additionally, Zenit progressed past the Europa League group stage in first place in its group to the round of 16 stage, where they defeated Swiss club Young Boys. On 6 March 2011, Zenit defeated CSKA Moscow in the Russian Super Cup, winning Spalletti his third Russian trophy. On 17 March 2011, Zenit lost in the Europa League quarter-finals to Twente 2–3 on aggregate.

In the 2011–12 UEFA Champions League, Zenit started the group stage in Group G alongside Porto, Shakhtar Donetsk and APOEL. On 6 December 2011, Zenit finished the group stage in second place and, for the first time in club history, qualified for the spring knockout phase of the Champions League. In the first leg against Benfica, Zenit won 3–2 at home through two goals from Roman Shirokov and one from Sergei Semak. However, in the second leg, Zenit lost 2–0 and was eliminated from the competition. On 9 February, Spalletti signed a three-and-a-half-year contract extension to stay at Zenit until 2015. In April 2012, Zenit won their second-straight Premier League championship after defeating Dynamo Moscow.

After three trophy-less seasons, Spalletti was sacked on 10 March 2014.

Return to Roma
Spalletti was appointed manager of Roma for his second spell on 13 January 2016, after ex-manager Rudi Garcia was sacked due to poor team performances. On 21 February, Francesco Totti publicly criticised Spalletti due to his own lack of playing-time since returning from injury. As a result, Totti was dropped by Spalletti for Roma's 5–0 win over Palermo, with the decision causing an uproar among fans and the media. After their initial disagreements, Spalletti began to use Totti as an immediate impact substitute, which proved to be an effective decision, as Totti rediscovered his form and contributed with four goals and an assist after coming off the bench in five consecutive Serie A matches. As a result, Spalletti was able to lead Roma from a mid-table spot to a second-place finish in Serie A, clinching the Champions League play-off spot.

On 30 May 2017, two days after finishing the 2016–17 season in second place, Roma confirmed Spalletti had decided to leave the club by mutual consent. During his second stint with Roma, the team qualified for the Champions League for two consecutive seasons.

Inter Milan
On 9 June 2017, Spalletti was confirmed as the new manager of Inter after signing a two-year contract. This came after he travelled to Nanjing, China, to hold talks with Zhang Jindong, managing director of Suning Holdings Group, majority owner of Inter.

On 29 July, Spalletti won the International Champions Cup friendly tournament in Singapore after defeating Lyon, Bayern Munich and Chelsea. On 20 August, Spalletti won his first league match with Inter after defeating Fiorentina 3–0 at the San Siro. On 26 August, he won his second match with Inter against his former club Roma, 1–3. On 3 December, Inter took first place, after 12 victories and 3 draws, with a 5–0 win over Chievo Verona. Inter retained their first place after a 0–0 draw against Juventus, thus becoming the only Italian team still undefeated after the first 16 weeks.

On 20 May 2018, at their last game of the season, Inter defeated Lazio 2–3 to finish the league in fourth place and therefore qualify for the UEFA Champions League for the first time in six years. In August 2018, the club extended the contract of Spalletti, adding two more years to 2021.

In the 2018–19 season the club again secured a hard-fought UEFA Champions League finish on the last day of the competition. However, Spalletti was sacked on 30 May 2019, following speculation of his future.

Napoli
On 29 May 2021, after two years of inactivity, Spalletti was announced as the new head coach of Napoli, replacing Gennaro Gattuso.

First season 2021–22:

In his first season in the club, although the season was trophyless, he led Napoli to finish 3rd in Serie A table, securing Champions League qualification for the first time in 2 years.

Second Season 2022–23: record breaking

In the summer of 2022, many experienced players left the team, including veteran defender Kalidou Koulibaly, club top goal scorer in all competitions Dries Mertens, midfielder Fabian Ruiz, and team captain Insigne. To supplant their losses, the team in return brought in players such as Giacomo Raspadori, Khvicha Kvaratskhelia, Giovanni Simeone, and Kim Min-jae. 

On 7 of September, Napoli began their Champions League season by defeating 2021-22 finalists Liverpool 4–1. On 4 October 2022, Napoli routed Ajax 6–1 at the Johan Cruyff Arena, inflicting the worst defeat ever to the Dutch giant in European competitions. Despite recording their first loss of the season away to Liverpool, on 1 November Spalletti led Napoli to finish first in their group and qualify for the knockout rounds.

On 23 October, Napoli beat Roma 1–0, marking their 11th straight victory across all competitions to match the club record set in 1986 with Maradona, also going 3 points clear on top of Serie A table.

On 13 January 2023, Napoli crushed rivals Juventus 5–1, the worst defeat for Juventus in Serie A since 1993, as well as Napoli's 10th home win in all competitions.

On 21 January, Napoli defeated Salernitana 2–0, ensuring a 12 point lead on the top of Serie A table, and becoming the third side in the three points for a win era to have reached 50+ points in the first half of a single Serie A season, after Juventus in 2013–14 and Inter in 2006–07.

On 15 March, Napoli defeated Eintracht Frankfurt 3-0 and 5-0 on aggregate, to advanced to UEFA Champions League Quarter-finals for the first time in their history.

Personal life 
Spalletti and his wife Tamara have three children: Samuele (1992), Federico (1995), and Matilde (2011).

Managerial statistics

Honours

Manager
Empoli
 Serie B promotion: 1996–97
 Serie C1 playoff winner: 1995–96

Roma
 Coppa Italia: 2006–07, 2007–08
 Supercoppa Italiana: 2007

Zenit Saint Petersburg
 Russian Premier League: 2010, 2011–12
 Russian Cup: 2009–10
 Russian Super Cup: 2011

Individual
 Serie A Coach of the Year: 2005–06, 2006–07
 Panchina d'Oro: 2004–05
 Serie A Coach of the Month: September 2021, February 2022, October 2022, January 2023

See also
 List of Inter Milan managers
 List of A.S. Roma managers

References

External links

 Luciano Spalletti at Goal.com
 
 Luciano Spalletti at Zenit-History.ru

1959 births
Living people
People from Certaldo
Association football midfielders
Italian footballers
Serie C players
Empoli F.C. players
Spezia Calcio players
Italian football managers
Empoli F.C. managers
Udinese Calcio managers
A.S. Roma managers
Serie A managers
U.C. Sampdoria managers
A.C. Ancona managers
Venezia F.C. managers
FC Zenit Saint Petersburg managers
Russian Premier League managers
Expatriate football managers in Russia
Italian expatriate sportspeople in Russia
Italian expatriate football managers
Inter Milan managers
S.S.C. Napoli managers
Sportspeople from the Metropolitan City of Florence
Footballers from Tuscany